ISO 42500 "Sharing economy - General principles" standard identifies the general principles to be used by all types and sizes of organization in Sharing Economy (e.g. commercial enterprises, government agencies, not-for-profit organizations).

The organizations that choose to use ISO 42500 as a reference for general principles, can help improve information and transparency towards their customers.

ISO 42500 was published for the first time in November 2021 by the Committee ISO/TC 324.

Main requirements of the standard 
ISO 42500: 2021 is structured according to the following chapters:

1 Scope
2 Normative references
3 Terms and definitions
4 Guiding principles
4.1 General
4.2 Integrity
4.3 Transparency
4.4 Accountability and authorization
4.5 Accessibility and inclusion
4.6 Respect for other affected interests
4.7 Competence
Annex A Figure representing the sharing economy
Bibliography

History

See also 
 Quality management system
 List of ISO standards
 Conformity assessment
 International Organization for Standardization

References 

ISO standards